Harold Frederick Abbott (14 June 1906 – 8 June 1986) was an Australian portrait painter, an official war artist and an art teacher by profession.

Abbott was born in 1906 in the Sydney suburb of Strathfield, New South Wales. At the age of seventeen, he started studying part-time art at Sydney Art School. In 1931 he moved to London for two years to study at the Royal Academy, funded by the NSW Society of Artists Travelling Scholarship. In 1934–1940 he was a finalist in the Archibald Prize and in 1940 he won the Sulman Prize. In 1941 he enlisted in the AIF. In 1943 he was appointed a war artist in 2/9th Field Regiment with the rank of lieutenant.

For twenty years after the war, Abbott did little painting or exhibiting; he taught at the National Art School in Sydney, where he later became the head and State Supervisor of Art. Upon retirement in the late 1960s he returned to painting, but with a quite different style, and held 8 solo exhibitions.

His work is held in the collections of the National Gallery of Australia, the Art Gallery of New South Wales, the Australian War Memorial, and in various regional art galleries.

Abbott's works in the Australian War Memorial Collection
Over 170 of Abbott's works are listed in the Australian War Memorial Collection. These include:
Sergeant Leslie Ralph McCole<ref>ART21282: Harold Abbott – Sergeant Leslie Ralph McCole'], 1944, Australian War Memorial Collection</ref> Corporal William (old Bill) Green Sergeant Arthur CarsonFinalist in the Archibald Prize
1934: Four works: Miss Ruth Waterhouse; Master Bruce Abbott; Rev. John Edwards, M.A. and J. Armstrong, Esq.1935: Miss Susan Davies1936: Three works: Miss Nancy Sinclair; The Hon. Mr Justice Boyce and Mrs Frank Hosking1937: Self Portrait and runner up: Miss Jeanie Ranken1938: Self Portrait1939: Five works: Mrs C. de Burgh; Neil McNeill, Esq. [sic; Robert Gillespie, Esq; Miss Margaret Murray and Mrs R. Abbott1940: Dr W. Arundel Orchard1943: Patient Awaiting Plastic Surgery1945: Sgt. Reg Rattey1946: Self-portrait1950: George Lucas1951: Jakovljevich DushanWorks in the Art Gallery of NSWrecto: Old Italian verso: (seated female nude) (circa 1934) Miss Jeanie Ranken (1937)David (1950)

Finalist in the Sir John Sulman Prize
1940: Winner: Vaucluse Interior1950: The Brothers Gamack''

References

1906 births
1986 deaths
Australian artists
Artists from Sydney
Australian war artists
Archibald Prize finalists